The following lists events that happened during 2015 in Botswana.

Incumbents
 President: Ian Khama 
 Vice President: Mokgweetsi Masisi

Events

November
 November 16 – The world's second-largest diamond of gem quality, Lesedi La Rona, is found in the Karowe mine located north of Gaborone by the Lucara Diamond Corp.

References

 
2010s in Botswana
Years of the 21st century in Botswana
Botswana
Botswana